George Street United Church (built 1873) is the oldest extant Methodist church building in St. John’s, Newfoundland and Labrador.  Designed by Elijah Hoole, it is an example of a modified Gothic Revival church. 

Constructed of local stone quarried from the Southside Hills in St. John's, the entire building is sheathed in concrete. Despite this, many typical Gothic elements remain intact including the pointed arch, lancet windows, and the large stained glass windows. Furthermore, the interior of this church is architecturally valuable for its well-preserved woodwork. The exposed timber hammerbeam roof of the nave is a typical Gothic element.

The church is designated as a Heritage Structure due to its architectural and historical value.

The city's oldest Methodist church congregation and the first Methodist church building (1815), later destroyed by fire, was Gower Street Methodist (now United) church; its current structure was also designed by Elijah Hoole.

References

United Church of Canada churches in Newfoundland and Labrador
Churches in St. John's, Newfoundland and Labrador
Gothic Revival architecture in St. John's, Newfoundland and Labrador